Five ships of the Royal Navy have been named HMS Victorious.

 , launched at Blackwall Yard, London, was a 74-gun third-rate ship of the line
 , launched at Bucklers Hard, was a 74-gun third rate
She had a quiet career, spending World War I as a dockyard repair ship before being broken up in 1923.
She saw much action in World War II. She was scrapped in 1969.
 , launched in 1993, is a  ballistic missile submarine

Other ships
 The Royal Navy pre-dreadnought battleship  was briefly named HMS Victorious II in 1918–1919 before reverting to her original name.

See also
 Victorious (disambiguation)
 
 
 

Royal Navy ship names